The 2016 Guernsey general election was held on 27 April 2016 to elect 38 members of the States of Guernsey who will serve until 2020.

There was a by-election in October 2016 to fill a vacancy in the district of Vale.

Electoral system
Following the 2012 general election, it was decided to reduce the number of seats from 45 to 38. This resulted in reductions to the number of seats in most electoral districts, although the districts themselves remained unchanged.

A new electoral roll was drawn up, with 22,408 people registered to vote by 4 November 2015. The total passed 25,000 by 7 January 2016 and rose to 27,000 on 15 February, before reaching 30,320 when registration closed, higher than the 29,745 who registered for the 2012 elections.

Campaign
Prospective candidates started to register by filing their nominations at the Bailiff's Chambers on 21 March and had until 31 March 2016 to file nomination forms. There are no political parties; all candidates stood as non-partisans. Candidates could apply for a grant of up to £600 for the production and distribution of manifestos. A total of 81 candidates stood for the 38 seats.

Hustings meetings took place at a number of locations on various dates in April.

Results
20 deputies kept their seats, 4 former deputies were re-elected and 14 new deputies were elected. 10 deputies, including 4 ministers, lost their seats.

26 men and 12 women were elected as deputies. The previous assembly had just 5 women deputies.

21,803 voted (up from 20,459), representing 71.9% (up from 71.4%) of those who had registered to vote; 93,085 votes were cast (down from 95,612) due to fewer seats.

Castel

South East

St Peter Port North

St Peter Port South

St Sampson

Vale

West

Post-election controversy
Six male candidates who had failed to be elected filed a letter of complaint, alleging that the election was illegal as the States of Guernsey had provided funding to encourage more women to stand for election and to provide them with assistance by running a course. The complaint was rejected on the basis that the funds had been provided and spent before any candidates had put their names forward for the election, therefore they did not assist any 'candidates'. They subsequently asked the UK government to investigate the election.

References

External links
Election 2016
Information for prospective candidates

Elections in Guernsey
2016 elections in Europe
General election
2016
April 2016 events in Europe